Czarnkowo may refer to the following places:
Czarnkowo, Bytów County in Pomeranian Voivodeship (north Poland)
Czarnkowo, Białogard County in West Pomeranian Voivodeship (north-west Poland)
Czarnkowo, Stargard County in West Pomeranian Voivodeship (north-west Poland)